Anna Bayerová (4 November 1853 – 24 January 1924) was the second Czech female medical doctor, after Bohuslava Kecková. Both of them were prevented from practicing as doctors in their own country so Kecková became a Czech midwife, whereas Bayerová had a medical practise in Berne.

Biography
Bayerová was born in Vojtěchov (now part of Mšeno) near Mělník on 4 November 1853, the youngest child of Josef and Marie Bayer. She attended school in Mělník until 1868, when she moved to Prague, where she met the authors Eliška Krásnohorská and Sofie Podlipská, and took gymnasial exams, despite not being allowed to attend the gymnasium.

In 1875, Bayerová moved to Zurich and started attending classes at the University of Zurich. However, she suffered financial problems and returned home in 1878. Eventually, after receiving money to continue her studies, Anna Bayerová graduated from the University of Bern and thus became the second female Czech physician in 1881. However, like the first female Czech physician (Bohuslava Kecková, who graduated in 1880 from the University of Zurich), Bayerová graduated from a Swiss university rather than a Czech one, and had to practice abroad as her doctorate was not recognized by her homeland. The third woman doctor was Anna Honzáková. Bayerová graduated from the University of Bern and was the first to practice successfully. She established her own private practice in Berne whereas Bohuslava Kecková had the first qualification she became a Czech midwife.

In 1889 Bayerová's achievement was recognised by popular support. 700 women wrote an open letter to her and the women's magazine Ženské Listy. The letter hoped that she could return as they wanted to see female doctors in their country.

She died on 24 January 1924 in Prague. In her hometown there is a street named in her honour.

References

External links

1853 births
1924 deaths
People from Mělník District
19th-century Czech physicians
Czech feminists
University of Zurich alumni
Czech midwives
19th-century women physicians